The San Narciso Hurricane was the ninth and last known hurricane of the 1867 Atlantic hurricane season. Forming in late October, the hurricane, the costliest and deadliest storm of the 1867 Atlantic hurricane season, caused at least 811 deaths in Saint Thomas (Danish West Indies) and Captaincy General of Puerto Rico and at least $1 million (1867 USD) in damage.

Meteorological history
On or before 27 October 1867, a tropical storm developed east of the northern Lesser Antilles, and the mail steamer Principe Alfonso skillfully avoided the storm on that day. This tropical storm moved westward or west-southwestward, intensifying into a hurricane on or before 28 October 1867. Intensifying into a major hurricane on 29 October, this tempest hit Sombrero, Anguilla. The northeasterly or northerly wind intensified from 1 am through 6 am; after 8 am, a barometric pressure of  accompanied a half-hour of relative calm. The wind then shifted to a violent easterly until 11 am and then diminished through 1 pm.

From 1:30 pm to 2:00 pm, its eye passed over Sankt Thomas, Danish West Indies.

The hurricane weakened slightly before reaching Captaincy General of Puerto Rico later on 29 October, the memorial of Saint Narcissus of Jerusalem; following the Puerto Rican convention of naming hurricanes after the saint of the day on which a hurricane strikes the island, the storm acquired the name San Narciso.  The hurricane made landfall in Puerto Rico, and its winds decreased further over the island.  Despite its small size, it ranks among the most intense hurricanes recorded on the island.  It passed near the city of Fajardo, between 5 pm and 6 pm and later passed near Caguas.  People sensed tremors in the towns of Humacao, Luquillo, and Peñuelas.  The storm affected all of the towns in the island of Puerto Rico. San Narciso hit the island of Hispaniola on 30 October 1867.  The storm probably dissipated that day over the high mountains of the island.

Impact

The hurricane caused at least 811 deaths in total: 600 in Sankt Thomas (Danish West Indies - now Saint Thomas, the United States Virgin Islands) and 211 on Puerto Rico.

On Tortola (British Virgin Islands), the storm reached its peak fury from noon to 2 pm and blew down one-third of the "miserable tenements." Deaths numbered 22 at Road Town, 2 on Peter Island, and 2 on Westland (now Soper's Hole).

It caused 211 deaths in Puerto Rico, and the damages were calculated at 13 million Spanish escudos. The hurricane ruined agriculture of the island of Puerto Rico, causing a great economic crisis.  The hurricane and various other factors contributed to the discontent on the island that erupted into the Grito de Lares of 1868.

It almost destroyed the city of Santo Domingo de Guzmán, Dominican Republic, where 200 persons died on that day.

See also

Tropical cyclone
List of Atlantic hurricanes
1867 Virgin Islands earthquake and tsunami – Devastating event that struck the same region 20 days later

References

1860s Atlantic hurricane seasons
Category 3 Atlantic hurricanes
Hurricanes in Puerto Rico
1867 in Puerto Rico
October 1867 events
1867 natural disasters
1867 meteorology
1867 disasters in North America